The governor of Guam ( / ) is the head of government of Guam and the commander-in-chief of the Guam National Guard, whose responsibilities also include making the annual State of the Island (formerly the State of the Territory) addresses to the Guam Legislature, submitting the budget, and ensuring that Guam's public laws are enforced. The position was created in 1968, through the passage of the Guam Elected Governors Act which took effect in 1970. Guam elected its first civilian governor in 1970 with the inauguration of former governor Carlos Camacho.

The current governor is Lou Leon Guerrero, a Democrat who was inaugurated on January 7, 2019 following her election in 2018.

Powers and duties
The governor has a duty to enforce Guam's public laws, the power to either approve or veto bills passed by the Guam Legislature, to convene the legislature, and to commute or grant pardons to criminal sentences, except in cases of treason and impeachment. The governor is given the power to control government budgeting and appoint many officials (including many judges).

Unlike the other government departments that compose the executive branch of government, the governor is themselves head of the state executive Department. The governor may also perform ceremonial roles, such as greeting dignitaries, issuing symbolic proclamations or commencing the Liberation Day parade.

As the commander-in-chief of the Guam National Guard, the governor, as well as the president, may call on the Guard at a moment's notice to provide defense for the island, in a state of emergency.

The governor also delivers the annual State of the Island address (similar to the State of the State address in the US) to a special session of the Guam Legislature. The speech is given to satisfy a constitutional stipulation that a governor must report annually, or in older constitutions described as being "from time to time", on the state or condition of the territory.

Seat and residence

Sitting along Route 1, the governor's seat of power is located in Adelup in the Ricardo J. Bordallo Governor's Complex, named after the island's 2nd and 4th governor, Ricardo Bordallo.

The governor lives in his/her official residence at the Government House in Agaña Heights. The island's former Spanish and American military governors had lived in the Governor's Palace in the Plaza de España (Hagåtña) until its destruction in the shelling of Hagåtña during the reconquest of Guam in World War II.

Election process

Eligibility
According to the Elective Governors Act:

"No person shall be eligible for election to the office of Governor or Lieutenant Governor unless he/she is an eligible voter and has been for five consecutive years immediately preceding the election a citizen of the United States and a bona fide resident of Guam and will be, at the time of taking office, at least thirty years of age. The Governor shall maintain his/her official residence in Guam during his/her incumbency."

To be eligible, a candidate for Governor of Guam must:
an eligible voter of Guam
a United States citizen
at least thirty years of age.
has lived in Guam for five years, preceding the general election.

Election
According to the Elective Governor Acts of 1968, the Governor of Guam, together with the Lieutenant Governor, shall be elected by a majority of the votes cast by the people who are qualified to vote for the members of the Legislature of Guam. The Governor and Lieutenant Governor shall be chosen jointly, by the casting by each voter of a single vote applicable to both offices. The first election for Governor and Lieutenant Governor was held on November 3, 1970, with the election of Governor Carlos Camacho and Lt. Governor Kurt Moylan. 
Beginning in 1974, Guam's Governor and Lieutenant Governor is elected by direct vote, on the first Tuesday of November. The Governor and Lieutenant Governor shall hold office for a term of four years and until their successors are elected and qualified.

Inauguration

The Governor of Guam usually takes the oath of office on the first Monday of January. In past inaugurations, however, the governor-elect and lieutenant governor-elect would take the oath of office past midnight on Monday morning.

Traditionally, the lieutenant governor-elect takes the oath first and delivers his inaugural remarks, followed then by the incoming governor-elect. As soon as the governor takes the oath of office, four ruffles and flourishes are played then followed by "The Stars and Stripes Forever" and a 21-gun salute. The newly inaugurated governor delivers his inaugural address, an opportunity for the new leader to state his goals for the next 4 years.

Oath of office
Pursuant to the Guam Organic Act, the governor's term of office begins at midnight on the first Monday of January of the year following the election. The day marks the beginning of the four-year term of the Governor and Lieutenant Governor of Guam. Before executing the powers as the Governor of Guam, the governor must take an oath of office:

In line with traditional oath-takings, governors have traditionally palmed a Bible and have added, "So help me God!" at the end of their oaths. The Governor of Guam is sworn in by the Chief Justice of Guam.

Succession

Tenure and term limits
The Governor of Guam is only limited two terms as prescribed in the Elective Governors Act:
No person who has been elected Governor for two full successive terms shall again be eligible to hold that office until one full term has intervened.
The term of the elected Governor and Lieutenant Governor shall commence on the first Monday of January following the date of election.
However, a former governor can be re-elected once again only after a full term has passed.

History

Spanish era

In 1565, Miguel López de Legazpi formally declared Spanish sovereignty over the Mariana Islands. However, there was no permanent Spanish presence on the island and it was ruled from the Philippines as part of the Spanish East Indies by the Governor-General of the Philippines. Diego Luis de San Vitores established a mission on Guam in 1668, but Francisco de Irrisari was the first person to take the title "Governor" in June 1676, amidst the Spanish-Chamorro Wars. Antonio de Saravia, who arrived in June 1681, was the first to receive his appointment as governor from the Spanish throne, meaning that, technically, he was no longer subordinate to rule from the Philippines or Mexico.

American capture of the territory (1898)

Political instability (1898–1899)

American Naval governors (1899–1941)

Japanese military governors (1941–1944)

American military governors (1944–1949)

Appointed civilian governors (1949–1971)

Elected governors (1971–present)

See also 
 List of governors of the Spanish Mariana Islands
 List of governors of the Northern Mariana Islands
 First ladies and gentlemen of Guam

References

External links
Office of the Governor

Guam

Governor
Politics of Guam